Dobin am See is a municipality in the Ludwigslust-Parchim district, in Mecklenburg-Vorpommern, Germany.

Villages
Alt Schlagsdorf
Buchholz
Flessenow
Liessow
Neu Schlagsdorf
Retgendorf
Rubow

History

The community of Dobin am See has existed since June 14, 2004, arising from a merger of the former communities Retgendorf and Rubow.  The name Dobin stems from the name of a castle which the Obotrite prince Niklot had constructed between the Schwerin Lake and the Döpe around 1160.  Niklot destroyed his own castle during the Wendish Crusade, a campaign during the Northern Crusades, while resisting conquest by the Saxon duke Henry the Lion.  Most villages associated with Dobin were founded during the 13th century.  From the 15th century to the 18th century, the villages of Alt Schlagsdorf, Buchholz, Flessenow, Neu Schlagsdorf, Retgendorf and Rubow belonged to the von Sperling family.  Up until World War II, the area was part of the Grand Duchy of Mecklenburg-Schwerin.  After 1945, it passed to the state of Mecklenburg, then to the GDR region of Schwerin.

Geography
Dobin am See lies on the northeastern shore of Schwerin Lake amid a hilly terminal moraine landscape.

Notable residents
The poet August Heinrich Hoffmann von Fallersleben stayed in Buchholz from 1844 to 1849; many of his poems had their origin in the area.

References

Ludwigslust-Parchim
Grand Duchy of Mecklenburg-Schwerin